Terrano may refer to:
 Nissan Frontier, a pickup truck
 Nissan Terrano, a sport utility vehicle
 Nissan Mistral (Terrano II), a sport utility vehicle
 Nissan Pathfinder, a sport utility vehicle
 Terrano or Teran, a Croatian, Italian and Slovenian dark-skinned wine grape variety 
Mondeuse noire, a French wine grape that is also known as Terrano